Jacqueline Patricia Pillon  (born December 27, 1977) is a Canadian  actress. She is best known as the voice of Matt from Cyberchase and Cookie Falcone (MacDougall) in Fugget About It.

Life and career

Early life 

Pillon was born in Windsor, Ontario, Canada as the youngest of four children. She was educated and graduated from the renowned Monsignor Feeney Choir school in London. She ultimately graduated with an Hon. B.Sc. in Physical Anthropology from The University of Toronto.

Career
At the age of 12, she started her first work in the theater. As a voice artist she first appeared in Gahan Wilson's The Kid, as the title character. Other roles include Jane Doe, Crossed Over, Master Spy: The Robert Hanssen Story, and Gilda Radner: It's Always Something, as comedy writer Anne Beatts. She also appeared on Queer as Folk and Street Time.

Her first major animation role was Matt in the PBS animated series Cyberchase. Her voice has been featured in Medabots, Chilly Beach, Odd Job Jack, and Fugget About It. She starred in the Christmas special A Very Barry Christmas opposite Colin Mochrie. She used to provide the voice for the W Network in Canada, before she was replaced.

Filmography

References

External links
 

1977 births
Living people
Canadian voice actresses
Canadian television actresses
Actresses from Windsor, Ontario
Franco-Ontarian people